Badzyn may refer to:
Bądzyn, Masovian Voivodeship, Poland
Bądzyń, Łódź Voivodeship, Poland